Teqball is a ball sport that is played on a curved table, combining elements of sepak takraw and table tennis. Back and forth, the players hit a football with any part of the body except arms and hands. Teqball can be played between two players as a singles game, or between four players as a doubles game. The game is represented at an international level by the International Federation of Teqball (FITEQ). A number of world-class footballers have been attracted by the game, and after being added to the programmes for the 2021 Asian Beach Games and the 2023 European Games, the sport is now aiming for Olympic inclusion.

Teqball became the world's fastest-recognised sport in August 2018 when its highest governing body FITEQ was officially recognised by the Olympic Committee of Asia (OCA). In June 2019 it was officially recognised by the Association of National Olympic Committees of Africa (ANOCA).

In November 2020, FITEQ was granted full membership of the Global Association of International Sports Federations (GAISF).

History
Teqball was invented in 2012 in Hungary by three football enthusiasts: former professional player Gábor Borsányi [hu]; Hungarian businessman György Gattyán; and computer scientist Viktor Huszár. The creative idea came from Gábor Borsányi, who used to play football on a table tennis table. The horizontal design of the table made the ball often not bounce to the players, so this game was not enjoyable. Borsányi thought that if the table were bent, the arched surface could help the ball bounce to the foot. After several years of development with Viktor Huszár, the first teqball table was made in 2014.

The sport was officially presented in Budapest, Hungary on October 18, 2016, by Brazilian ex-football player Ronaldinho, one of the ambassadors of teqball.

Rules
The rules are laid out in the FITEQ's set of rules.

Summary 
Teqball can be played with balls used in football, with size five being official and recommended.
 Teqball can be played by two players (singles game) or by four players (doubles game).
 A teqball match consists of best-of-three sets.
 Each set is played until a player/team reaches 12 points.
 Every player/team has two attempts to complete a successful service.
 The players/teams change service after each four points.
 It is forbidden to touch the ball with the same body part twice consecutively 
 It is forbidden to return the ball with the same body part twice consecutively.
 Every player/team is allowed to return the ball with a maximum of 3 touches by any body part, except for the hands and arms.
 In doubles, a team has a maximum of 3 touches, however, the teammates must pass the ball at least once to each other.
 While playing, neither the table nor the opponent can be touched.
 In case of an edgeball, the rally shall be repeated.

Playing court 
The Teq table is in the exact middle of the court with the net being parallel to the shorter sides’ perimeters.

Teq table 

Ball 
The ball is spherical and must be made of leather or another suitable material and has a latex bladder with a butyl valve. The ball is a regular sized 5 football, which has a lower pressure (between 0.3 and 0.5 atmospheres) than a normal football.

Intellectual property
Unlike equipment in traditional sports, the design of the teqball table is patented, so only Teqball International or others with a license from Teqball Holding SARL may legally manufacture tables. The name "teqball" itself is trademarked, giving the trademark holder control over who may advertise teqball events or otherwise use the name in public. The teqball inventors view these legal restrictions as essential to their efforts to grow the sport.

Competitions

Teqball World Championships
The Teqball World Championships is an annual competition organised by FITEQ.

The Teqball World Championships has both Singles and Doubles competitions with men and women participating together. The first Teqball World Championships was held in Budapest, Hungary in 2017 with more than 20 participating nations. The 2018 version of the event was held from 12 to 13 October in Reims, France with a total of 90 players participating.

The 2019 Teqball World Championships took place from 6–8 December in Budapest. Around 160 athletes representing 58 countries competed across singles, doubles and mixed doubles events.

FITEQ has taken the decision to postpone the 2020 Teqball World Championships due to the ongoing uncertainty and restrictions related to the COVID-19 pandemic.

African Beach Games
Teqball was included in the first African Beach Games in Sal, Cape Verde on 14–23 July 2019. Cameroon won the title by beating Nigeria in the final.

Asian Beach Games & Asian Indoor and Martial Arts Games (AIMAG) 
As a sport that is officially recognised by the Olympic Council of Asia (OCA), teqball was added to the programme for the Sanya 2020, but The Olympic Council of Asia (OCA) has postponed the Sanya Asian Beach Games, which was due to take place from 2–10 April 2021, as well as the Bangkok and Chonburi Asian Indoor and Martial Arts Games (AIMAG), which was scheduled for 21–30 May 2021. The decisions were taken by the OCA Executive Board in light of the ongoing challenges with the COVID-19 pandemic.

The OCA, the National Olympic Committee of Thailand and the AIMAG 2021 Organising Committee have agreed that the event, in which teqball will be a demonstration sport, will now be held from 10 to 20 March 2022. The OCA has noted that it will continue its consultation with the Chinese Olympic Committee and the Sanya Asian Beach Games Organising Committee to agree a new date for the 6th Asian Beach Games, where teqball is set to make its debut as a medal sport.

European Games 
The European Olympic Committees (EOC) announced an agreement with FITEQ that will see teqball included for the first time in the programme of the European Games in 2023.

World Rankings 
FITEQ has World Rankings for singles, doubles and mixed doubles, based on World Ranking points attained in official FITEQ events. FITEQ publishes regular updates to its World Rankings, which are used determine the seeding of players into tournaments. Last updated on: 22 February 2022.

Awards 
Red Dot Design Award

 2015 – Teq Smart
 2020 – Teq Lite

ISPO Award 2015, 2016

IF Design Award 2018 – Teq Smart

Hungarian Design Award 2019 – Teq Smart

References

External links

Teqball homepage

 
Association football variants
Ball games
Football
Sports introduced in the 21st century